The Russian First Division 2003 was the 12th edition of Russian First Division. There were 22 teams.

Teams

Standings

Top goalscorers

See also
Russian Premier League 2003

References
 PFL

2
Russian First League seasons
Russia
Russia